The Kikinda oil field is an oil field located in Kikinda, Serbia. The oil from the Kikinda fields are the same genetic type as that of Mokrin oil fields.

References

Oil fields in Serbia